Wireless Home Digital Interface (WHDI) is a consumer electronic specification for a wireless HDTV connectivity throughout the home.

WHDI enables delivery of uncompressed high-definition digital video over a wireless radio channel connecting any video source (computers, mobile phones, Blu-ray players etc.) to any compatible display device.  WHDI is supported and driven by Amimon, Hitachi Ltd., LG Electronics, Motorola, Samsung Group, Sharp Corporation and Sony.

Versions 
The WHDI 1.0 specification was finalized in December 2009. Sharp Corporation will be one of the first companies to roll out wireless HDTVs. AT CES 2010 LG Electronics announced a WHDI wireless HDTV product line.

In June 2010, WHDI announced an update to WHDI 1.0 which allows support for stereoscopic 3D, and WHDI 2.0 specification to be completed in Q2 2011.

WHDI 3D update due in Q4 2010 will allow support for 3D formats defined in HDMI 1.4a specification

WHDI 2.0 will increase available bandwidth even further, allowing additional 3D formats such as "dual 1080p60", and support for 4K × 2K resolutions.

Technology 
WHDI 1.0 provides a high-quality, uncompressed wireless link  which supports data rates of up to 3 Gbit/s  (allowing 1920×1080 @ 60 Hz @ 24-bit) in a 40 MHz channel, and data rates of up to 1.5 Gbit/s (allowing 1280×720 @ 60 Hz @ 24-bit or 1920×1080 @ 30 Hz @ 24-bit) in a single 20 MHz channel of the 5 GHz unlicensed band, conforming to FCC and worldwide 5 GHz spectrum regulations. Range is beyond , through walls, and latency is less than one millisecond.

History

2005

December 

AMIMON releases news of a device capable of "uncompressed high definition video streaming wirelessly."

2007

January 

AMIMON showcases its WHDI (wireless high definition interface) at CES. Sanyo demonstrates the "world's first wireless HD projector," using AMIMON's technology, which allows for the same quality as a DVI / HDMI cable.

August 

AMIMON begins shipping its WHDI chips to manufacturers.

December 

WHDI becomes High-Bandwidth Digital Content Protection (HDCP) Certified, garnering the necessary approval  for any device to deliver HD video to another device, a requirement in Hollywood movie studios. It is considered an Approved Retransmission Technology (ART). The approval allows for WHDI to begin selling devices that will carry HD content to a broader market.

2008

April 

Sharp partners with AMIMON to offer Sharp's X-Series LCD HDTVs offered with WHDI wireless link, the first CE product to use WHDI technology.

July 
AMIMON collaborates with Motorola, Samsung, Sony and Sharp in order to form 'a special interest group to develop a comprehensive new industry standard for multi-room audio, video and control connectivity'.

August 
Mitsubishi announces that it will offer television sets in Japan capable of communicating with WHDI-enabled equipment.

September 
JVC plans to produce a wireless HDMI box to launch in 2009.

December 
AMIMON Ships Its 100,000th Wireless High-definition Chipset.

ABI Research reports wireless HDTV vendors are putting money into products though few are available for consumption in North America.

Stryker Endoscopy's WiSe HDTV will use WHDI and be the first HD wireless display specifically for the operating room, the first use of WHDI technology in the professional market.

2009

April 
AMIMON introduces its second-generation chipset operating in the 5 GHz unlicensed band with AMN 2120 transmitter and AMN 2220 receiver. The chipset is capable of full uncompressed 1080p/60 Hz HD and supports HDCP 2.0. The unit also becomes available to manufacturers.

May 
Gefen begins shipping its WHDI towers, targeting the custom installation market. The towers use AMIMON's 5 GHz technology and can support a maximum of five remote receivers on the same video stream. They support 1080p with Dolby 5.1 surround audio.

September 
Philips launches Wireless HDTV Link with an HDMI transmitter and receiver and 1080p/30 HD video transmission.

Sony announces it will release the ZX5 LCD television in November. It is capable of receiving 1080p wirelessly.

2010

January 
LG announces a partnership with AMIMON and prepares shipment of a wireless HDTV product line with second-generation WHDI technology embedded.

July 
WHDI becomes 3D video capable.

September 
ASUS joins the WHDI Consortium and aligns with AMIMON to introduce the WiCast EW2000. The WiCast connects a PC via USB to an HDTV via HDMI.

October 
Galaxy announces the GeForce GTX 460 WHDI Edition video card. The card is intended for PC gamers.

AMIMON announces the WHDI stick reference design, a noticeably smaller device than those previously released.

November 
HP announces the WHDI certified HP Wireless TV Connect

2011

January 
WHDI comes to TVs, PCs, tablets and a projector at the 2011 Consumer Electronics Show (CES).

KFA2 (Galaxy) releases the first wireless graphics card, GeForce GTX460 WHDI 1024MB PCIe 2.0. The card uses five aerials to stream 1080p video from a PC to a WHDI-capable television.

September 
AMIMON showcases the HD camera link Falcon-HD, a transmitter and receiver accessory for professional HD cameras and monitors at the International Broadcasting Convention (IBC) in Amsterdam.

2012

January 
AMIMON teams up with Lenovo to integrate WHDI technology in the IdeaPad S2 7, removing the need for an external transmitter.

April 
AMIMON  launches Falcon, a wireless transmitter/receiver system kit for the professional camera and monitor market, at the National Association of Broadcasters (NAB) Show in Las Vegas.

June 
AMIMON announces the AMIMON Pro Line, using WHDI technology  to expand uses from the CE market to the Professional market.

Elmo introduces MO-1w Visual Presenter, the first use of WHDI technology in the presentation industry.

Supporters 
Promoters
 AMIMON
 Hitachi Ltd.
 LG Electronics
 Motorola
 Samsung Group
 Sharp Corporation
 Sony

Contributors
 D-link
 Haier
 Maxim
 Mitsubishi Electric
 Rohde & Schwarz
 Toshiba

Adopters
 Askey
 ASUS
 ATEN International Co., Ltd.
 Belkin
 Dfine Technology
 Domo Technologies
 Elmo
 Galaxy Microsystems Ltd.
 Gemtek
 Hefei Radio
 Hosiden
 HP
 Hunan space satellite Communication co.ltd.
 IOGear
 Jupiter (MTI)
 LiteOn Technology Corp.
 Murata Manufacturing
 Olympus Corporation
 Quanta Microsystems - QMI
 Seamon Science International
 SRI Radio Systems
 Syvio Image Limited
 TCL Corporation
 TDK
 Telecommunication Metrology Center
 Winstars
 Zinwell

See also 
 Ultra-wideband
 Wireless USB
 Wireless HDMI:
 Intel Wireless Display (WiDi) version 3.5 to 6.0 supports Miracast;  discontinued
 Miracast
 WirelessHD
 WiGig
 Wi-Fi Direct
ip based:
 Chromecast (proprietary media broadcast over ip: Google Cast for audio or audiovisual playback)
 AirPlay (proprietary ip based)
 Digital Living Network Alliance (DLNA) (ip based)
port / standard for mobile equipment:
 Mobile High-Definition Link - MHL
 SlimPort (Mobility DisplayPort), also known as MyDP

External links 
 WHDI.org, the official website of WHDI SIG
 Developing Wireless High-Definition Video Modems for Consumer Electronics Devices by Guy Dorman, AMIMON
 VE829, FHD 5x2 HDMI Wireless Extender
The Main Wireless HDMI Transmission Protocols and Their Typical Products, Comparison of main wireless HDMI transmission protocols

References 

Networking standards
Wireless display technologies